Pembuang River or Seruyan River is a river of Borneo, Indonesia. The river has its source near Bikit Tikung (1,175 metres) in the Schwaner Mountain Range. The eastern side of the river contains dense forest down to Sembulu (Belajau) lakes and is said to be a major habitat of the orangutan. Pembuang means "place of rejection".

Geography
The river flows in the middle to the south of Borneo island with predominantly tropical rainforest climate (designated as Af in the Köppen-Geiger climate classification). The annual average temperature in the area is 24 °C. The warmest month is November, when the average temperature is around 26 °C, and the coldest is February, at 23 °C. The average annual rainfall is 3118 (2971-3480) mm. The wettest month is December, with an average of 491 mm rainfall, and the driest is September, with 67 mm rainfall.

Hidrology
The Seruyan River (previously named Seroejan) is a river that crosses and flows in the Seruyan Regency, Central Kalimantan province, Indonesia. The river flows from north to south and empties into the Java Sea has a length of 350 Km and a navigable 300 Km through several cities, an average depth of 6 m and an average width of 300 m.

A number of its tributaries:

• Sembuluh Lake River

• Salau River

• Pukun River

• Kalua River 

• Lanan River

• Bai River

See also
List of rivers of Indonesia
List of rivers of Kalimantan

References

Rivers of Central Kalimantan
Rivers of Indonesia